South African Barbarians is an invitational rugby union club styled along the lines of Barbarian F.C. It was formed in 1960 by Frank Mellish, the former 1951–52 Springbok selector and manager, together with former Natal Rugby Union President, Harry Stacey.  The club is directly affiliated to the South African Rugby Union.

Club colours and emblem
The club's colours are a light and dark blue quartered jersey with white shorts.  Players may wear socks of their choice (usually preferring their own club socks).  The blazer badge is similar to that used by the Barbarians in 1929, although playing jerseys simply have a leaping lamb on the left chest.

History

Origins
The club's first incarnation was as a combined All Blacks and Springboks team under the captaincy of Avril Malan, in a fixture played against Natal RFC during the All Blacks' tour of South Africa in 1960. Another "red letter" day in the club's history was when it defeated the touring British Barbarians at Port Elizabeth in 1969. The club's existence was precarious thereafter but merged with the Quaggas, a Transvaal Barbarians side, in 1976 and recorded a narrow defeat (31–32) against the touring All Blacks' side of that year.

In May–June 1979, the SA Barbarians played against the Middlesex RFC County Centenary touring team, captained by 1974 B&I Lion Chris Rawlston, with a 28–28 draw being recorded.

1979 Tour to the United Kingdom
Later that year, possibly the most significant event for the club was being the first multiracial South African rugby team to tour outside South Africa when it went to the United Kingdom in October 1979.  The tour squad had eight white players (SARB), eight coloured players (SARFF) and eight black players (SARA/SARU) and was managed by Chick Henderson, formerly of Oxford University RFC, Richmond RFC, Coventry RFC and Transvaal RFC and who had gained nine caps for Scotland.  Attempts were made from the start to integrate the squad's three ethnic groups, with six of the eight white Barbarians rooming with black or coloured teammates on the first overnight stay.  The squad was coached in English despite only two of the twenty four using English as their first language whilst tour singing was often in Xhosa.

Seven fixtures were played, an eighth scheduled fixture against Maesteg on 20 October 1979 being cancelled, the results were as follows:

The Scottish leg of the tour saw two very demanding fixtures against "representative XVs", the first a highly creditable draw against a Borders Select which contained ten full Scottish capped players. The Sunday fixture against a strong Co-Optimist outfit containing five internationals was notable for the absence of a sizeable number of the white players from the starting line up on grounds of religious observance, principally amongst the forwards (only two white players started, with a further two joining as replacements, whilst previous starting line ups had included at least half a dozen of the white playing contingent).

It was tour policy to ensure that all players, injuries permitting, were selected to play a game in each of the three countries visited.

Seven of the touring side went on to gain full Springbok status: Martiens Le Roux, Ewoud Malan, Rob Louw and Divan Serfontein all featured against Bill Beaumont's 1980 Lions. Errol Tobias was later capped against Ireland in 1981 whilst Hennie Bekker and Div Visser gained their first caps on the "Barbed Wire Tour" to New Zealand later on in that year.

Seventeen of the twenty-four 1979 UK tourists represented various invitational or provincial sides against the touring Lions during 1980. Two significant fixtures specifically involving the SA Baa Baas took place during this tour. The first saw King's Park, Durban hosting the British and Irish Lions versus SA Baa Baas with five of the 1979 tour party included together with Hugo Porta and one time Australian back rower, Mark Loane. The second fixture of note involving the SA Baa Baas was the curtain raiser ahead of the Fourth Test Match at Loftus Versfeld. The Baa Baas included eight of the touring Lions party, alongside Porta and Jean-Pierre Rives in their match against a Junior Springbok side that contained two coloured players, Errol Tobias and Charles Williams (both 1979 UK tourists), the first two non-white players ever to represent what effectively was the Springboks second XV.

1984 Tour to West Germany
Five years later on and the SA Barbarians undertook their second overseas tour, this time to West Germany. The touring party of twenty five was composed of twelve white and thirteen coloured and black players. Four fixtures were played (in Bonn, Wiedenbruck, Hannover and Heidelberg) 314 points were scored and only 27 conceded. South African "sides" had toured Southern Germany in 1974 and 1977 but this was the first multiracial tour to the Federal Republic which received official support and was seen as a reciprocal visit to the unofficial West German tour to South Africa in 1983 (under the guise of a Bonner XV)

Later amateur era
When the All Blacks' proposed tour to South Africa in 1985 was cancelled, a Springbok Internal Tour was arranged, the highlight of which was when the shadow Springbok team defeated the SA Baa Baas. One year on, the club also faced the touring New Zealand Cavaliers.

During the 1987 rebel South Sea Barbarians' 13 match tour (a team made up of representatives from Fiji, Samoa, Tonga and one Canadian(!)), organised in lieu of the cancelled visit by Australia, the SA Barbarians played two matches. No official test matches took place between the teams, however, in contrast to the 1985 and 1986 sides, the 1987 SA Barbarians lineup had a far more distinct Springbok XV feel to it despite some senior players questioning the quality of the opposition. The South Sea tourists were defeated 56–30 at Ellis Park but pushed their hosts considerably closer at Kings Park one week later in a narrower 38–32 loss. Earlier in March of the same year, a fixture to commemorate the centenary of the Crusaders club of Port Elizabeth had seen the Barbarians record a 16–10 victory.

In 1988 a multiracial side (the SA Barbarians in all but name - they toured as the Nampak Pioneers) eventually undertook a six match visit to Chile and Paraguay after a series of postponements and reschedulings. Home sides were intended to be bolstered by considerable Argentinian and Uruguayan representation - which did not come to pass and consequently a series of one sided encounters took place with over 100 points being scored against the respective national sides.

The professional era
As with other Barbarian clubs internationally the club has struggled to get fixtures in the professional era although it hosted a touring Welsh XV in June 1993 when (despite the inclusion of nine Springboks and three Namibian internationals) Wales ran out comfortable winners, 56–17. The SA Barbarians subsequently toured to the UK later on in the same year.

Notable players
Many well-known international players from other countries have represented the club including Hugo Porta, Jean-Pierre Rives, Tom Grace and Fergus Slattery. The 1992 SA Barbarian side that played against Transvaal featured Philippe Sella, Philippe Saint-André, Peter Winterbottom and Willie Ofahengaue.

2013 squad

Head Coach:  Pine Pienaar

Results

See also

Australian Barbarians
Brussels Barbarians
Fiji Barbarians
French Barbarians
New Zealand Barbarians

References

Barbarian F.C.
International rugby union teams
 
Rugby clubs established in 1960
1960 establishments in South Africa